Colobothea rincona is a species of beetle in the family Cerambycidae. It was described by Giesbert in 1979. It is known from Costa Rica.

References

rincona
Beetles described in 1979